Salvia prunelloides is a herbaceous perennial native to the Mexican states of Puebla and Mexico State. It was named in 1817 by Carl Sigismund Kunth for its similarity to Prunella vulgaris.

Salvia prunelloides is a small procumbent plant with nodules on its roots that spreads through underground runners. The lax stems are less than 1 foot long, with small trowel-shaped leaves that reach up to 1.25 inches long by 0.75 inches wide, with a 0.5 inch petiole. The leaves give off a faint hay-like aroma when brushed. Flowering is sporadic, with 0.5 inch periwinkle-blue flowers that grow in tight whorls at the end of the inflorescence. The flower's upper lip is hooded and small, with the lower lip three times as long. The lower lip has faint white markings leading to the pollen inside.

Notes

Plants described in 1818
prunelloides
Flora of Mexico